Salmi may refer to:

 Albert Salmi (1928–1990), American actor
 Jorma Salmi (1933–2016), Finnish ice hockey player and coach
 Samuel Salmi (born 1951), Finnish prelate
 Sulo Salmi (1914–1984), Finnish  Swiss orienteering competitor
 Vexi Salmi (1942–2020), Finnish lyricist
 Salmi (rural locality), a rural locality (a settlement) in the Republic of Karelia, Russia
 Salmi (air base), a former Soviet air base
 Salmi, short name for salmagundi, a salad dish originating in England
 Salmis, a rich stew or ragoût of game meat